Engineers of Sweden, Sveriges ingenjörer, is a trade union and professional association in Sweden, gathering 160,000 members.

It was created in 2007 by merger of Sveriges Civilingenjörsförbund, which also used the name Swedish Association of Graduate Engineers in English, with the smaller Ingenjörsförbundet; in 2022 the union changed its English name to the less formal-sounding name Engineers of Sweden.

References

External links 
Website

Trade unions in Sweden
Professional associations based in Sweden
Engineering organizations